Limnocharis is a genus of plants in the family Alismataceae, native to Mexico, Central America, the West Indies and South America) but naturalized in China, India, and Southeast Asia as well. Two species are recognized as of May 2014:

Limnocharis flava (L.) Buchenau - most of generic range
Limnocharis laforestii Duchass. ex Griseb - from Mexico to Argentina

References

Alismataceae
Alismataceae genera
Taxa named by Aimé Bonpland
Taxa named by Alexander von Humboldt